Sadar Bazaar may refer to:
 Saddar Bazaar, a main market or bazaar in India and Pakistan
 Sadar Bazaar, Delhi, a wholesale market in Delhi, India
 Sadar Bazaar, Agra, a shopping destination for tourists in Agra, India
 Sadar Bazar (Vidhan Sabha constituency), a legislative assembly constituency in Delhi, India
 Sadar Bazar Jhansi, a location in Jhansi, India
 Sadar Bazar Barrackpore, a location in Barrackpore, West Bengal, India
 Sadar Bazar Lucknow, a location in Lucknow, India
 Sadar Bazar Railway station, a small railway station in Sadar Bazaar, Delhi